Romuald Siemionow (31 July 1949 – 17 November 2008) was a Polish sports shooter. He competed at the 1976 Summer Olympics and the 1980 Summer Olympics.

References

1949 births
2008 deaths
Polish male sport shooters
Olympic shooters of Poland
Shooters at the 1976 Summer Olympics
Shooters at the 1980 Summer Olympics
People from Łapy
20th-century Polish people